Chunkara (Aymara for "pointed mountain", also spelled Chuncara) is a  mountain in the Andes in Bolivia. It is located in the Oruro Department, Cercado Province, Paria Municipality (formerly Soracachi). Chunkara lies northeast of Jach'a Ch'ankha.

References 

Mountains of Oruro Department